Laurence Damien Harper (born 10 December 1970 in Deniliquin, New South Wales) was an Australian first-class cricketer who played for the Victorian Bushrangers as a left-handed middle order batsman. He played 38 first class games for the Bushrangers, making 2316 runs at 36.18 with 5 hundreds and took one wicket. He was regarded as one of the best slip fieldsman of the time which was fortunate as speed in the covers was not a strong point. Harper won his state's Player of the Year title in 1997-98 edging out Dean Jones for the award.

See also
 List of Victoria first-class cricketers

External links
 

Victoria cricketers
1970 births
Living people
People from Deniliquin
Australian cricketers
Cricketers from New South Wales